San Román is one of eleven parishes (administrative divisions)  in Candamo, a municipality within the province and autonomous community of Asturias, in northern Spain. 

Villages
 Ferreras 
 Las Parrucas 
 San Román

Demography

References 

Parishes in Candamo